The Garibaldi Névé is a snowfield in the Pacific Ranges of the Coast Mountains in southwestern British Columbia, Canada, located on the north and east sides of Mount Garibaldi in New Westminster Land District.

Glaciers
The following glaciers are part of the Garibaldi Névé:

Garibaldi Glacier
North Pitt Glacier
South Pitt Glacier
Lava Glacier
Sentinel Glacier
Warren Glacier
Bishop Glacier
Phoenix Glacier
Pike Glacier

Accessibility
This easterly paved road traverses the Squamish Golf and Country Club and then heads north through Quest University. Mamquam Road then extends northeast and becomes Garibaldi Park Road. The  Diamond Head hiking trail commences from the parking lot to the Elfin Lakes where Opal Cone, Columnar Peak, The Gargoyles and Mamquam Icefield can be viewed. A  hiking trail extending from the Elfin Lakes leads down to Ring Creek then climbs Opal Cone where Mamquam Lake and the Garibaldi Névé can be viewed from its summit. The route to the Garibaldi Névé is marked by cairns.

See also
List of glaciers in Canada

References

Glaciers of the Pacific Ranges
Garibaldi Ranges
Sea-to-Sky Corridor
Ice fields of British Columbia
Névés